Joshua James Walker (born 28 December 1997) is an English professional footballer who plays for Burton Albion, as a striker.

Career
Born in London, Walker spent his youth career with Tottenham Hotspur and Fulham. He then spent time in non-league with Wealdstone, Hendon, Barnet, and Dagenham & Redbridge, before signing for Burton Albion in January 2023.

References

1997 births
Living people
English footballers
Tottenham Hotspur F.C. players
Fulham F.C. players
Wealdstone F.C. players
Hendon F.C. players
Barnet F.C. players
Dagenham & Redbridge F.C. players
Burton Albion F.C. players
National League (English football) players
English Football League players
Association football forwards